Ornithomyinae is a subfamily of the fly family Hippoboscidae. All are blood feeding parasites, for the most part on birds, though some have mammals as hosts.

Systematics
Subfamily Ornithomyinae Bigot, 1853
Genus Allobosca Speiser, 1899 (1 species)
Genus Austrolfersia Bequaert, 1953 (1 species)
Genus Crataerina von Olfers, 1816 (8 species)
Genus Icosta Speiser, 1905 (52 species)
Genus Microlynchia Lutz, 1915 (4 species)
Genus Myophthiria Rondani, 1875 (13 species)
Genus Olfersia Leach, 1817 (7 species)
Genus Ornithoctona Speiser, 1902 (12 species)
Genus Ornithoica Rondani, 1878 (24 species)
Genus Ornithomya Latreille, 1802 (29 species)
Genus Ornithophila Rondani, 1879 (2 species)
Genus Ortholfersia Speiser, 1902 (4 species)
Genus Phthona Maa, 1969 (3 species)
Genus Proparabosca Theodor & Oldroyd 1965 (1 species)
Genus Pseudolynchia Bequaert, 1926 (5 species)
Genus Stilbometopa Coquillett, 1899 (5 species)

References

Parasitic flies
Hippoboscidae
Brachycera subfamilies
Taxa named by Jacques-Marie-Frangile Bigot